Lieber so (Better This Way) is the sixth studio album by German recording artist Yvonne Catterfeld, released by Columbia Records and Sony Music on 22 November 2013 in German-speaking Europe. While production of the album was overseen by Roland Spremberg, several musicians contributed to Lieber so, including producers Marcus Brosch and Christian "Crada" Kalla as well as rappers Kitty Kat and Sera Finale, Jennifer Rostock keyboarder Joe Walter, and Swiss pop singer Mia Aegerter.

Upon its release, Lieber so earned mixed to positive reviews from music critics but became a moderate chart success, debuting and peaking at number 14 on the German Albums Chart. A reissue of the album, released in 2015 to accompany Catterfeld's participation in the second season of the reality television series Sing meinen Song - Das Tauschkonzert, the German version of The Best Singers series, surpassed this peak and has since reached number eight in Germany. Also, Lieber so entered the charts in Austria and Switzerland, where it became her highest-charting effort in a decade.

Chart performance
Upon its release, Lieber so debuted at number twenty-one on the German Albums Chart. It marked Catterfeld's sixth consecutive top forty entry, though it charted significantly higher than Blau im Blau, her fifth album which had peaked at number thirty-seven in 2010. Internationally, Lieber so failed to chart on any foreign music market – her first album to do so in Austria.

Re-released in 2015 to accompany Catterfeld's participation in the second season of the reality television series Sing meinen Song - Das Tauschkonzert, the German version of The Best Singers series, Lieber so re-entered the charts only four days after the broadcast of Catterfeld's episode. Surpassing its initial peak, it debuted at number 14 on the German Albums Chart and has since reached number eight, becoming her highest-charting album since 2005's Unterwegs. Also, Lieber so made its chart debut in Austria, where it debuted at number thirty-one on the Ö3 Austria Top 40 and has since reached number fifteen. In Switzerland, the reissue became Catterfeld's first chart entry in nine years; it has since peaked at number twenty, her highest-charting album since Unterwegs.

Track listing

Charts

Weekly charts

Release history

References

External links
 YvonneCatterfeld.com — official site

2013 albums
Yvonne Catterfeld albums